Orphanostigma is a genus of moths of the family Crambidae described by William Warren in 1890.

Species
Orphanostigma abruptalis (Walker, 1859)
Orphanostigma angustale Hampson, 1893
Orphanostigma excisa (E. L. Martin, 1956)
Orphanostigma fulvistriga Swinhoe, 1894
Orphanostigma perfulvalis (Hampson, 1899)
Orphanostigma vibiusalis (Walker, 1859)

References

Spilomelinae
Crambidae genera
Taxa named by William Warren (entomologist)